James Chrysostom Boucher (22 December 1910 – 25 December 1995) was an Irish cricketer. He was a right-handed batsman and off-break bowler.

Boucher was educated at Belvedere College in Dublin. He made his debut for Ireland against a team known as "The Cataramans" in July 1929. He went on to play for them on 60 occasions, his last game coming against Scotland in July 1954. He then served as honorary secretary of the Irish Cricket Union until 1973.

Of his matches for Ireland, 28 had first-class status, and in those games he took 168 wickets at an average of 14.04. His best bowling was 7/13 against New Zealand in September 1937. In all matches for Ireland he took 307 wickets, one of only two Irish bowlers to take more than 300 wickets.

References

External links
CricketEurope Stats Zone profile

1910 births
1995 deaths
People educated at Belvedere College
Irish cricketers
Cricketers from County Dublin